is a Japanese actress.

She has been awarded the Tama best Emerging Actress Award and Fumiko Yamaji Freshman Actress Award in 2016. She gained international attention as an ambassador of the Tokyo International Film Festival for 2017 and her role in the Palme d’Or winning film Shoplifters.

Filmography

Film

Television

Video on demand

Dubbing roles

Live-action
Jurassic World – Gray Mitchell (Ty Simpkins)

Animation
Cars 3 – Cruz Ramirez
DC League of Super-Pets – PB

Awards

References

External links

 Official website 
 

1995 births
Living people
Japanese child actresses
Japanese television personalities
Actresses from Tokyo
21st-century Japanese actresses
Japanese film actresses
Japanese television actresses